Synchiropus randalli, the Randall's dragonet, is a species of fish in the family Callionymidae, the dragonets. It is found in the Southeast Pacific off of Chile.

Etymology
The fish is named in honor of ichthyologist John E. Randall, of the Bishop Museum in Honolulu, for his many contributions to the knowledge of the fishes of Easter Island.  Where randalli appears to be endemic. Randall also helped collect the type specimen.

References

randalli
Fish of the Pacific Ocean
Taxa named by Ronald Fricke
Fish described in 1985